The 1940 Tschammerpokal was the 6th season of the annual German football cup competition. In the final which was held on 1 December 1940 in the Olympiastadion Dresdner SC defeated 1. FC Nürnberg 2–1 after extra time. It was the first final which was not decided in regular time.

Matches

First round

Replay

Second round

Replay

Round of 16

Quarter-finals

Semi-finals

Final

References

External links
 Official site of the DFB 
 Kicker.de 
 Tschammerpokal at Fussballberichte.de 

1940
1940 in German football cups